Franck Edouard Bezi or Edu (born December 28, 1988) is an Ivorian footballer.

References

1988 births
Living people
Ivorian footballers
Ivorian expatriate footballers
Ivorian expatriate sportspeople in Indonesia
Expatriate footballers in Indonesia
Liga 1 (Indonesia) players
Persiba Balikpapan players
Association football defenders
21st-century Malian people